Romstar Inc. was a video game distribution company based in Torrance, California that started operations in 1984. They originally started as the first American distribution arm for SNK (before SNK of America was founded in 1987). They were known for licensing arcade games from major makers for distribution. Among Romstar's clients include Taito, Capcom, SNK, Toaplan, and Seta. They also made games for the Nintendo Entertainment System, the Super Nintendo Entertainment System, and Game Boy. The ultimate fate of the company is not known. Games continued to be released using the Romstar name until at least 1994 (Goofy Hoops). It is also partnered with Capcom in 1993 to form Game Star (a.k.a. GameStar Inc.), an electromechanical factory in Arlington Heights, Illinois that Romstar had a 30% stake in. In 1995, Capcom would later fully take over Game Star to form Capcom Coin-Op, a pinball manufacturer.

The key personnel of Romstar, Takahito Yasuki, Ron Czerny, and Darryl Williams, later founded Atrativa Games and Playphone, both cellular phone entertainment companies. Playphone was acquired by GungHo Online Entertainment in October 2014.

List of Games Distributed by Romstar

Licensed from Taito 
 Tiger Heli (developed by Toaplan)
 Arkanoid
 Bubble Bobble
 Arkanoid: Revenge of DOH
 Twin Cobra (developed by Toaplan)
 Sky Shark (developed by Toaplan)
 Empire City: 1931 (developed by Seibu Kaihatsu)
 Aqua Jack
 Twin Eagle (developed by Seta, NES version)
 Battle Lane Vol. 5 (developed by Technos)
 Final Blow
 Rally Bike (developed by Toaplan, NES)
 Top Speed
 Kageki (developed by Kaneko)
 Tokio
 China Gate (developed by Technos)
 Thundercade (developed by Seta)
 Super Qix (developed by Kaneko)
 The Ninja Warriors
 Kickstart
 Great Swordsman (developed by Allumer)
 Tournament Arkanoid

Licensed from Capcom
 1942 (also distributed by Williams)
 Ghosts 'n Goblins (also distributed by Taito)
 Side Arms: Hyper Dyne
 Trojan
 Black Tiger
 Gun.Smoke
 Tiger Road
 F-1 Dream
 The King of Dragons
 Varth: Operation Thunderstorm
 SonSon

Licensed from SNK 
 Baseball Stars 2 (NES version)
 Time Soldiers (developed by Alpha Denshi)
 Sky Soldiers (developed by Alpha Denshi)
 Gold Medalist (developed by Alpha Denshi)
 Neo Geo (One-slot conversion kit version)

Licensed from Seta 

 Castle of Dragon (developed by Athena)
 DownTown
 Caliber .50
 Thunder & Lightning (developed by Visco, NES)
 Meta Fox (developed by Jorudan)
 Nolan Ryan's Baseball (SNES)

Licensed from Toaplan 
 Out Zone
 Snow Bros.
 Fire Shark

Others 
 Double Dragon II: The Revenge (developed by Technos)
 Bloody Wolf (developed by Data East)
 Flashgal (developed by Kyugo, published by Sega)
 Skeet Shot (developed by Dynamo, top new video game on RePlay arcade charts in December 1991)
 Popshot (prototype, developed by Dynamo)
 World Bowling (developed by Athena, Game Boy)
 Championship Bowling (Arcade/NES)
 Cowboy Kid (developed by Visco Games, NES)
 Magic Darts (NES)
 Mr. Chin's Gourmet Paradise (Game Boy)
 Torpedo Range (developed by Seta, Game Boy)
 Goofy Hoops (redemption, partially based on same hardware as Capcom pinballs)

References 

Defunct video game companies of the United States
Video game companies established in 1984